Arginine and glutamate-rich protein 1 is a protein that in humans is encoded by the ARGLU1 gene located at 13q33.3.

The protein product of this gene has been proposed as a MED1-interacting protein required for estrogen-dependent gene transcription and breast cancer cell growth.

The ARGLU1 gene expresses at least three distinct RNA splice isoforms - a fully spliced isoform coding for the protein, an isoform containing a retained intron that is detained in the nucleus, and an isoform containing an alternative exon that targets the transcript for nonsense mediated decay. Furthermore, ARGLU1 contains a long, highly evolutionarily conserved sequence known as an Ultraconserved Element (UCE) that is within the retained intron and overlaps the alternative exon.

References

External links
 

Genes on human chromosome 13